George Blagdon Westcott (fl. 24 April 1753 – 1 August 1798) was an officer of the Royal Navy. He served during the American Revolutionary and the French Revolutionary Wars, eventually rising to the rank of Captain. He was one of Vice-Admiral Horatio Nelson's Band of Brothers at the Battle of the Nile in 1798, in which battle he was killed.

Family and early life
Westcott's year of birth is unknown, but appears to have been between 1752 and 1753, and was likely in 1753. He was the son of a baker in Honiton, Devon, and was baptised on  24 April 1753. He joined the Navy sometime between 1765 and 1768, and by 1768 he was serving as master's mate aboard the frigate . He spent five years aboard Solebay, rising to the rank of midshipman, and spending time under George Vandeput. He then moved aboard , where he spent the next three years under Samuel Barrington and John Leveson-Gower. He passed his lieutenant's examination on 10 January 1776 and received his promotion to that rank on 6 August 1777, moving aboard . Under her captain, Samuel Granston Goodall, Valiant was present at the First Battle of Ushant on 27 July 1778, after which Westcott and Valiant joined the fleet under Sir Charles Hardy in 1779. He was present with Vice-Admiral George Darby's fleet when they relieved Gibraltar in April 1781.

In November that year Westcott moved aboard , then the flagship of Rear-Admiral Richard Kempenfelt. He was then present at Kempenfelt's victory at the Second Battle of Ushant on 12 December 1781. Wescott returned to Gibraltar under Lord Howe, and was then in action again at the Battle of Cape Spartel in October 1782. Salisbury was at that time the flagship of Commodore John Elliot.

Command
On 1 December 1787 Westcott was promoted to commander and between 1789 and 1790 had command of the sloop . He was promoted to captain on 1 October 1790, and became flag captain aboard .  When London was paid off in late 1791, Westcott went onto half-pay until becoming Rear-Admiral Benjamin Caldwell's flag captain aboard  in September 1793. Westcott was then present at the Glorious First of June in 1794, afterwards following Caldwell aboard . He went to the West Indies, but returned with Sir John Laforey in June 1796. Majestic then joined the Channel Fleet, and was present at the Spithead Mutiny in April and May 1797. Majestic then joined John Jervis off Cadiz, where Westcott was ordered to take her to join Rear-admiral Nelson in the Mediterranean.  Nelson was searching for the French fleet under Vice-Admiral François-Paul Brueys d'Aigalliers.

Death

When Nelson located the French fleet at anchor at Aboukir Bay, he quickly ordered the British into the attack. Majestic was towards the rear of the British line, and did not come into action until late in the battle. Trapped for several minutes, Majestic suffered heavy casualties. Westcott was hit by a musket ball in the throat and killed. Majestics first lieutenant, Robert Cuthbert took over and continued the battle. Cuthbert was confirmed as acting captain by Nelson the day after the battle.

Collingwood wrote of him: A good officer and a worthy man; but, if it was a part of our condition to choose a day to die on, where could he have found one so memorable, so eminently distinguished among great days?

Westcott was buried at sea. A monument to his memory, sculpted by Thomas Banks, was erected in St Paul's Cathedral, and another in the church in his birthplace at Honiton.  In January 1801, Nelson was passing through Honiton, on his way to take up a new command at Plymouth. Nelson invited his nearest surviving family to breakfast, and presented Mrs. Westcott with his own Nile medal, saying, "You will not value it less because Nelson has worn it." On 17 January 1801 he wrote to Lady Hamilton: At Honiton I visited Captain Westcott's mother – poor thing, except from the bounty of government and Lloyd's, in very low circumstances. The brother is a tailor, but had they been chimney-sweepers it was my duty to show them respect.

Notes

a.  Some confusion exists.  The Oxford Dictionary of National Biography suggests he was born around 1745, but Westcott's memorial in St Paul's Cathedral describes him as 46 at the time of his death in 1798, and parish records from Honiton indicate that he was baptised on 24 April 1753.
b.  Laughton's biography implies an entry date of 1768, whilst Westcott's memorial states he had been serving in the navy for 33 years at his death.

Footnotes

References

External links
Westcott's memorial, details at the National Maritime Museum
Genealogy of the Westcott family

1753 births
1798 deaths
Royal Navy officers
Royal Navy personnel of the American Revolutionary War
Deaths by firearm in Egypt
People from Honiton
British military personnel killed in the French Revolutionary Wars